The 1982 Wells Fargo Open was a women's tennis tournament played on outdoor hard courts at the Rancho Bernardo Inn in San Diego, California in the United States that was part of the Toyota Series of the 1982 WTA Tour. It was the fifth edition of the tournament and was held from July 26 through August 1, 1982. First-seeded Tracy Austin won the singles title, her fourth consecutive at the event, and earned $22,000 first-prize money.

Finals

Singles
 Tracy Austin defeated  Kathy Rinaldi 7–6(7–5), 6–3
 It was Austin's 1st singles title of the year and the 30th and last of her career.

Doubles
 Kathy Jordan /  Paula Smith defeated  Patricia Medrado /  Cláudia Monteiro 6–3, 5–7, 7–6(7–3)

Prize money

References

External links
 ITF tournament edition details
 Tournmanent draws

Wells Fargo Open
Southern California Open
Wells Fargo Open
Wells Fargo Open